Padma Adarsh Higher Secondary School is located in Vaniyanchavadi near Siruseri, Sipcot IT Park,  Chennai, Tamil Nadu, India. It was founded  by the Punjab Association.  The school conducts cultural events, Sports Days, athletic and cultural competitions, and Educational Tours each year.

The school has an onsite hospital and health center.

It has an Old Age Home for abandoned old people and a Home for Destitute Children.

The other schools set up by Punjab Association are Padma Adarsh Higher Secondary School, MGR Adarsh Public Matric Higher Secondary School, Anna Adarsh Matric Higher Secondary School, Adarsh Vidyalaya Higher Secondary School and Gill Adarsh Matriculation Higher Secondary School.

References

External links

High schools and secondary schools in Chennai